"Sleepless" is a song by the band King Crimson, released as a single in 1984. The track is best known for its distinctive opening bassline which features Tony Levin slapping on the strings to create a pulsating beat, and for the music video in which all four members of the band appeared.

Track listing

Personnel
King Crimson
Robert Fripp – guitar
Adrian Belew – guitar, vocals
Tony Levin – bass, Chapman stick, synthesizer, vocals
Bill Bruford – drums

Additional personnel
François Kevorkian – mixing (dance and instrumental versions)
Bob Clearmountain – mixing (single version)

Charts

References

King Crimson songs
1984 singles
Songs written by Adrian Belew
Songs written by Bill Bruford
Songs written by Robert Fripp
Songs written by Tony Levin
1984 songs
Warner Records singles